Bai Mudan is a type of white tea made from plucks each with one leaf shoot and two immediate young leaves (one bud two leaf ratio) of the Camellia sinensis plant. Bai Mudan is sometimes preferred by white tea drinkers for its fuller flavor and greater potency than the other major type of white tea, Bai Hao Yinzhen. The latter is made purely with leaf shoots, and so it is comparatively softer and more subtle. The typical taste of Bai Mudan is a result of both the processing and the tea plant cultivars employed in the production.



Production and processing
The family of tea cultivars used in producing Bai Mudan are the "Da Bai" (大白) varietal. In eastern Fujian, the cultivar Fuding Da Bai is used. In northern Fujian, the Zhenghe Da Bai cultivar is used. The differences in the plant yield two distinct styles of Bai Mudan: the Fuding variety and the Zhenghe variety.

Genuine Bai Mudan is a white tea; therefore, it is a slightly oxidized tea. The plucks are sun-withered for an extended period of time and then piled briefly for oxidation, during which enzymes of the tea leaves interact with other constituents to form new materials that result in the final taste and aromatic character of the tea. Depending on the weather, conditions of the pluck and the taste style requirements of the finished products, the sunning may last between 1 and 3 days and the piling between one half and 3 hours.

The leaves are then baked to dry for packing. The handling of the leaves remains gentle and non-intrusive throughout the process to avoid breakage of the cellular structure. This is needed because once the cell walls are physically broken, oxidation of the leaves quickens and the quality will be compromised.

Although the processing steps are simpler than those for other teas, the long process and the variable factors during which are key cost factors. For example, a sudden rainstorm during the lengthy withering can be destructive.

Tasting and brewing
A very mild peony aroma and a floral aroma are noticed when brewing the tea. The tea is best brewed with good mineral water and at 70 °C to 80 °C (158 °F to 176 °F). The brew is a very pale green or golden color. The flavor is fruity; stronger than Silver Needle, yet not as strong as Shou Mei. The finest quality should have a shimmering clear infusion with a delicate lingering fragrance and a fresh, mellow, sweet taste devoid of astringency, and grassy flavors.

See also
 Silver Needle tea
 White tea
 Robert Fortune
 Shou Mei tea
 Baihao Yinzhen

Varieties
 Gushan Baiyun otherwise known as Drum Mountain White Cloud is a good quality Bai Mu Dan, originally grown by Buddhist monks at the monastery on Drum Mountain in the Fujian Province. The tea has a nutty aroma and was apparently   tasted by Robert Fortune on his trip to China.

References

Further reading
 Master Lam Kam Cheun et al. (2002). The way of tea. Gaia Books. .
 Christopher Roberson (2000), White tea (China) from Usenet's rec.food.drink.tea FAQ, via pages.ripco.net

White tea
Chinese teas
Chinese tea grown in Fujian